Adnan Raza (born 5 December 1987) is a Pakistani former first-class cricketer who played for Lahore cricket team. In February 2021, he began to undertake coaching courses with the Pakistan Cricket Board.

References

External links
 

1987 births
Living people
Pakistani cricketers
Lahore cricketers
Cricketers from Lahore